Biləsər (also, Bilyasar) is a village and municipality in the Lankaran Rayon of Azerbaijan. It has a population of 1,884. The municipality consists of the villages of Biləsər, Ələzəpin, Seliqavol, and Viy.

References 

Populated places in Lankaran District